Gemma Sisia (born Gemma Rice; born 3 November 1971) is an Australian humanitarian. She established the School of St Jude in Tanzania in 2002, which "provides free, high-quality education to over 1,800 of the poorest Tanzanian children while boarding more than 1,400 students."

Biography 
Sisia was raised on a wool sheep property in Armidale, Australia. She was the only daughter of eight children. Her parents were Sue and Basil Rice. As a child, she competed in show jumping. Gemma attended St Vincent's College, Potts Point. Growing up, her family heavily emphasised education.

Sisia studied biochemistry, genetics, and education at Melbourne University. At age 22, she moved to Uganda to work in a convent school. A few months later, she met Richard Sisia, a Tanzanian safari driver, in Tanzania. They later married and had four children.

In January 2002, Sisia established the School of St Jude in Tanzania. The school has expanded to about 1,800 students, who "receive a free, high-quality education at the primary and secondary levels." Since 2015 the school has also established a graduate program, Beyond St Jude's, that supports Form 6 graduates through tertiary education. Prior to accessing tertiary education, Beyond St Jude's participants undertake a year of community service, usually in the form of volunteer teaching in local government schools.

References 

1971 births
Living people
People from Armidale
Australian humanitarians
Women humanitarians
Australian emigrants to Tanzania
University of Melbourne alumni